Kansuke (written: 悍右 or 勘助) is a masculine Japanese given name. Notable people with the name include:

 (1885–1965), Japanese writer
 (1501–1561), Japanese samurai
 (1914–1987), Japanese photographer and poet

Japanese masculine given names